The 2017 United States Grand Prix (formally known as the 2017 Formula 1 United States Grand Prix) was a Formula One motor race held on October 22, 2017, at the Circuit of the Americas in Austin, Texas, United States as the seventeenth round of the 2017 FIA Formula One World Championship.

Mercedes driver Lewis Hamilton entered the round with a 59-point lead over Ferrari's Sebastian Vettel in the World Drivers' Championship. Hamilton's teammate Valtteri Bottas was third, a further 13 points behind. In the World Constructors' Championship, Mercedes held a lead of 155 points over Ferrari, with Red Bull Racing a further 92 points behind in third place.

Mercedes clinched its fourth successive World Constructors' Championship after Hamilton won and Bottas finished 5th.

Background

Driver changes

Carlos Sainz Jr. moved from Toro Rosso to Renault and replaced Jolyon Palmer. Daniil Kvyat returned to Toro Rosso after having missed the Malaysian and Japanese Grands Prix, taking over Sainz's car. Pierre Gasly missed the round to compete in the final weekend of the 2017 Super Formula Championship and was replaced at Toro Rosso by the 2015 World Endurance Champion Brendon Hartley, who made his Formula One début, this was the first time a New Zealander participated in a Formula One race in 33 years.

Tyres
Tyre supplier Pirelli provided teams with the ultra-soft, super-soft and soft compounds of tyre. The purple branding on the ultra-soft compound was replaced by pink for the race to raise awareness of breast cancer. Several teams also incorporated pink into their liveries to support the cause (except Force India, whose cars were pink to begin with).

Qualifying

Notes
 – Daniel Ricciardo and Kimi Räikkönen set identical lap times in Q3. As Ricciardo was the first to set his time, he was considered to have qualified ahead of Räikkönen.
 – Max Verstappen received a 15-place grid penalty for exceeding his quota of power unit components.
 – Stoffel Vandoorne received a 30-place grid penalty for exceeding his quota of power unit components.
 – Nico Hülkenberg received a 20-place grid penalty for exceeding his quota of power unit components.
 – Lance Stroll received a 3-place grid penalty for impeding Romain Grosjean during qualifying.
 – Brendon Hartley received a 25-place grid penalty for exceeding his car's quota of power unit components.
 – Kevin Magnussen received a 3-place grid penalty for impeding Sergio Pérez during qualifying.

Race
Lewis Hamilton won after passing title rival Sebastian Vettel early on in the race with the German driver coming home second, Hamilton extended his Championship lead in the process to 66 points. Kimi Räikkönen was third, Max Verstappen did overtake Räikkönen on the final lap, although Verstappen was found to have cut the corner, resulting in a time penalty.

Race classification 

Notes
 – Max Verstappen originally finished third, but received a 5-second time penalty for leaving the track and gaining an advantage.
 – Marcus Ericsson received a 5-second time penalty for causing a collision.

Championship standings after the race

Drivers' Championship standings

Constructors' Championship standings

 Note: Only the top five positions are included for the sets of standings.
 Bold text and an asterisk indicates competitors who still had a theoretical chance of becoming World Champion.

Notes

References

United States
United States Grand Prix
Grand Prix
2017 in sports in Texas
Motorsport competitions in Texas
Sports in Austin, Texas
United States Grand Prix